TLC is a Dutch free-to-cable television channel which broadcasts lifestyle programmes. It airs programmes related to lifestyle, health, food, and reality shows. Its main target is the female audience. Warner Bros. Discovery EMEA launched the channel on 4 July 2011.

TLC initially aired from 6pm till 2am on the standard-definition channel of Animal Planet making this a time-sharing channel in the Netherlands.

On 1 October 2012 TLC extended its air time from 3pm till 2am. TLC became a 24-hours channel on 8 January 2013. An HD-simulcast started through UPC Netherlands on 15 May 2013.

Programming 
24 Hours in A&E
A Gypsy Life for Me
Ace of Cakes
Addicted
All-American Muslim
Anthony Bourdain: No Reservations
Beauty and the Geek Australia
Becoming Chaz
Boy Cheerleaders
Brides of Beverly Hills
Cake Boss
Candy Queen
Carson Nation
Cherry Healey Investigates...
Choccywoccydoodah
Confessions Of An Animal Hoarder
DC Cupcakes
Deadly Sins
Deadly Women
Devious Maids
Disappeared
Dr. G Medical Examiner
Dresscue Me
Driving Me Crazy
Extreme Couponing
Extreme Poodles
Facing Trauma
Fatal Encounters
Great British Food
Great British Hairdresser
Happily Ever Laughter
Hookers Saved on the Strip
How Sex Works
I Didn't Know I Was Pregnant
I Married a Mobster
I'm Pregnant And...
Jodie Marsh Tattoo Apprentice
Jodie Marsh: Bodybuilder
Kate Plus 8
Kell on Earth
Kill It, Cut It, Use It
Kitchen Boss 2
Kitchen Boss: Behind the Scenes
LA Ink
Last Chance Salon
Liefde In Uitvoering
Lily Allen: From Riches to Rags
Lip Service
Lottery Changed My Life
Ludo Bites America
Mad About the House
Mad Fashion
Made in Chelsea
Miami Ink 2
Mob Wives
My Big Fat American Gypsy Wedding
My Greek Kitchen
My Naked Secret
Next Great Baker 2
NY Ink
Offspring
On the Case with Paula Zahn
One Born Every Minute
Oprah: Behind the Scenes
Outrageous Kid Parties
Police Women of Broward County
Rich Bride, Poor Bride
Sarah Palin's Alaska
Say Yes to the Dress
Say Yes to the Dress: Bridesmaids
Secretly Pregnant
Sister Wives
Skins
Small Teen Bigger World
Snog, Marry, Avoid
Strange Sex
Take Home Nanny
The Rachel Zoe Project
TLC Doc: Josie: My Cancer Curse
TLC Doc: The Man with Half a Body
Toddlers and Tiaras
Too Fat for 15: Fighting Back
True CSI
Truth Be Told
Twincredibles
Underage and Having Sex
Virgin Diaries
What Not to Wear
Who Do You Think You Are
Why Is Sex Fun?
Will & Grace (season 9)
Will & Grace (season 10)
World's Worst Mom
Your Style in His Hands

See also
TLC (TV network)

References

External links
 tlc.nl
 tlc.be

Television channels in the Netherlands
Dutch
Television channels and stations established in 2011